Myctophum nitidulum, common name pearly lanternfish, is a species of deep sea fish in the family Myctophidae, the "lanternfish".

Description

Distribution
This species is circumglobal in all tropical and subtropical seas. It is found in the follow regions:
Eastern Atlantic Ocean ranging from Morocco to South Africa
Western Atlantic Ocean from approximately 42° north to 34° south.
The Indian Ocean from 7° north to 24° south
Pacific Ocean from 32° north to 31° south, while also extending north to 40° north travelling in the Kuroshio Current.
The South China Sea.

Myctophum nitidulum also occurs in the Galapagos.

Habitat
This species lives in the bathypelagic zone, is oceanodromous, and is found at depths up to 1000 metres.

References

External links
 Photo of specimen
 Photo of specimen

Myctophidae
Taxa named by Samuel Garman
Fish described in 1899